Ba Win (10 June 1901 – 19 July 1947) was a Burmese politician, and Minister of Trade in the Interim Government of Burma. He was the eldest brother of Aung San, and was assassinated together with his youngest brother during an Executive Council meeting on 19 July 1947. 19 July is commemorated each year as the Martyrs' Day in Myanmar.

Biography
He was born San Tin on 10 June 1901 in Natmauk to U Pha, a lawyer, and his wife Daw Suu. He was the eldest of nine children. He studied at Sayagyi U Wa Gyi School in Natmauk, and received a bachelor's degree from the University of Rangoon. He became a teacher at the National School in Taungdwingyi. In 1936 he married Khin Saw, daughter of U Ant, a lawyer and landowner and Daw Shwe May. He became the headmaster at the National School in Phyu from 1941 to 1942. He was Minister of Ministry of Trade.

He was survived by his wife Khin Saw and six children.

References

1901 births
1947 deaths
Assassinated Burmese politicians
People murdered in Myanmar
Anti-Fascist People's Freedom League politicians
Deaths by firearm in Myanmar
State of Burma
University of Yangon alumni
People from Magway Division
Burmese people of World War II
Family of Aung San